This is a list of Panjabi films of 2003.

List of films

External links 
 Punjabi films at the Internet Movie Database

2003
Punjabi